100.000 dollari per Ringo (or Centomilla dollari per Ringo) is a 1965 Spaghetti Western film directed by Alberto De Martino.

It was shown as part of a retrospective on Spaghetti Western at the 64th Venice International Film Festival.

Plot 
Lee Barton (Richard Harrison) rides into Rainbow Valley.  A stranger in town, he is mistaken for Ward Cluster, a former resident believed to have been killed in the Civil War.  When the residents mistake him for Cluster, they think he has come to get even with the Cherry brothers who are responsible for the death of his wife.  Even Cluster's young son Sean (Loris Loddi), who has been raised by an Indian chief named Gray Bear, believes Barton is his father.

The worst of the three Cherry brothers, Tom Cherry (Gerard Tichy) is involved with various dealings with the Mexican army. He has a love interest in local townswoman Deborah (Eleonora Bianchi). Although Deborah is married to Ive, a local drunk, she has a dubious reputation.

Tom Cherry is searching for $100,000 that was hidden by a Mexican general.  At one point, he captures and whips Barton.  Eventually, Tom kills both Deborah and Ive.

Barton joins forces with a wandering sheriff from Tucson and ultimately kills Tom in a shoot-out.  Barton finds the hidden money and plans a future with Sean.

Cast

Release
100.000 dollari per Ringo was released in Italy in November 1965 and in Spain in July 1966. Thomas Weisser commented that the film was relatively unknown in the United States, but that the film was one of Richard Harrison's greatest international box office hits.

Box office 
The film was one of the most successful Spaghetti Westerns of 1965, being one of only six to gross more than 1,236,276,000 Lira that year; and is the 32 highest grossing of all time.

See also
 List of Italian films of 1965

References

External links
 

1965 films
1965 Western (genre) films
Spaghetti Western films
1960s Italian-language films
Films directed by Alberto De Martino
Films scored by Bruno Nicolai
1960s Italian films